Echo Films is an American production company founded in April 2008 by production partner Kristin Hahn and American actress Jennifer Aniston. Echo Films has a production deal with Universal Pictures. The company produces projects for both film and television. Most of the projects star Jennifer Aniston.

History 
This is Jennifer Aniston's second production company. She previously found Plan B Entertainment with Brad Pitt and Brad Grey in 2002. In 2006, after Pitt and Aniston divorced, and Grey became the CEO of Paramount Pictures, Pitt became the sole owner of the company. Kristin Hahn also has another production company that she created in 2015 named Hahnscape Entertainment.

On the choice of the projects, Hahn said: "We particularly like working from books and real-life stories about distinct characters that embody something relatable and relevant about human nature's double-sided coin of vulnerability and mettle." On the name of the company, Aniston added that they were "drawn to stories about people finding their voice and finding their way because they help us as listeners and viewers do what we feel we're all trying to do, which is making sense of our lives through the stories of others. That's why we chose the name Echo, to echo back an idea, a challenge, something that resonates through all of us."

Cinema

In Development 
 Chemistry, screenplay by David Sussman
 Counter-Clockwise, screenplay by Paul Bernbaum
 First Ladies, screenplay by Tig Notaro and Stephanie Allynne, with Tig Notaro
 Getting Rid of Matthew, based on the novel of Jane Fallon and adapted by Jane Fallon
 Love: Todd, screenplay by Kristen Stavola
 Significant Other(s), directed by Jason Bateman, pitched 2016
 The Divorce Party, based on the novel of Laura Dave, adapted by Gwyn Lurie
 The Goree Girls, screenplay by John Lee Hancock & Margaret Nagle, directed by Mimi Leder with Ellen Pompeo, Sandra Oh, Jennette McCurdy, Jennifer Landon, Kelly Rowland, Pam Tillis, Melissa DiMarco, Jimmy Bennett, Laura Breckenridge, Cristine Rose 
 Untitled Aniston/Goodhart Comedy Project, directed by Sophie Goodhart
 What Alice Forgot, directed by David Frankel

Television

In Development 
 Hail Mary, directed by Michelle MacLaren

References 

Film production companies of the United States
Mass media companies established in 2008
Jennifer Aniston